Bednář (feminine Bednářová) is a Czech surname (meaning "cooper"). Notable people with the surname include:

Sportspeople

Baseball
Andy Bednar (1908–1937), American baseball player
David Bednar (baseball) (born 1994), American baseball player
Will Bednar (born 2000), American baseball player

Football (soccer)
Roman Bednář (born 1983), Czech footballer
Vladimír Bednár (born 1979), Slovak footballer

Ice hockey
Jan Bednář (born 2002), Czech ice hockey player
Jared Bednar (born 1972), Canadian ice-hockey coach and former player
Jaroslav Bednář (born 1976), Czech ice hockey player
Vladimír Bednář (born 1948), Czech ice hockey player

Other
Franz Bednar (1910 – after 1936), Austrian bobsledder who competed in the mid-1930s
George Bednar (1942–2007), American football player and beverage executive
Karolína Bednářová (born 1986), Czech volleyball player
Marcela Bednar, West German-German sprint canoer who competed in the 1990s
Markéta Bednářová (born 1981), Czech basketball player
Pavel Bednář (born 1970), Czech sprint canoer who competed in the 1990s
Robert Bednar (born 1911 – after 1936), Austrian bobsledder who competed in the mid-1930s

Other
Breck Bednar, 14-year-old English murder victim
David Bednar (general manager) (born 1952), American-born former theatre manager in Canada
David A. Bednar (born 1952), American educator and religious leader
Eva Bednářová (1937–1986), Czech printmaker
Kamil Bednář (1912–1972), Czech poet, translator, prose writer, dramatist and publishing house editor

Fictional characters
 Captain Bednar, a police captain in the novel The Man with the Golden Arm

Czech-language surnames
Occupational surnames